Brennus was the first pre-dreadnought battleship built for the  (French Navy). Completed in 1896, she was the sole member of her class, with a main battery of heavy guns mounted on the centerline and the first use of Belleville boilers. She formed the basis for several subsequent designs, beginning with Charles Martel. As completed in 1893, the ship was very top-heavy and had to be rebuilt over the next three years before she was ready to enter service.

Brennus spent the majority of her service in the Mediterranean Squadron, and she served as its flagship early in her career. In 1900, she accidentally rammed and sank the destroyer Framée. As newer battleships were commissioned into the fleet, Brennus was relegated to the Reserve Squadron in the early 1900s and then served as a training ship. The ship had been decommissioned before the First World War began in August 1914 and was disarmed in 1915. She served as a source of spare parts and equipment for other ships during the war. Her hulk was stricken from the naval register in 1919 and was ultimately scrapped three years later.

Design 

In 1880, the French Navy embarked on a naval construction program that included the ironclad battleships  and the three-ship ; the program called for two more vessels, which were to be laid down in 1882. The first of these was to have been named  and work began in 1885. Aube left the government in 1887 and his successor permitted work to resume; the ship's designer, Charles Ernest Huin, lobbied to restart construction to keep the shipyards busy. He re-designed Brennus to meet new requirements and the design was approved in 1889, allowing work to resume. The sections of hull that had been assembled on the slipway were dismantled, with the steel used elsewhere in the new ship. The fact that the same slipway was used to build both vessels, and parts of the original were reused in the latter vessel has caused some to conflate the vessels. The two ships were, nevertheless, distinct vessels. The second Brennus was ordered in 1888.

Brennus was the first pre-dreadnought-style battleship built in the French Navy; the previous Magenta-class ships were barbette ships, a type of ironclad battleship. The ship introduced several advances for the French fleet: new, 42-caliber guns arranged in turrets forward and aft of the superstructure, the first use of homogeneous steel armor, and the first Belleville boilers. Other changes included the adoption of a thin upper strake of armor to protect against quick-firing guns and the abandonment of the ram bow.

General characteristics and machinery 

Brennus proved to be grossly overweight; during her initial sea trials in 1893, her draft was  greater than it should have been, and this was not in a fully loaded condition. The increased draft submerged most of the ship's armored belt, rendering it largely useless. Her hull was subdivided by 18 watertight bulkheads and she had a double bottom that extended over the full length of the hull except at the bow. Brennus had a crew of 667 officers and enlisted men.

The ship suffered from very poor stability, largely a result of her massive superstructure that placed a great deal of weight high in the ship. These problems were not fully solved by extensive reconstruction between 1893 and 1896, which contributed to a short career. Her first stability trial was conducted on 17 June 1893 with all her guns traversed to starboard and her entire crew mustered on the same side; Brennus took on a 28° list and the barrels of her 164.7 mm casemate guns were half-submerged. Her metacentric height was calculated at  during this incident. The ship's excessive topweight from her massive superstructure, heavy military masts and tall funnels contributed to the problem, together with the pronounced tumblehome of her hull.

The boilers exhausted into a pair of large funnels located amidships. The decision to fit Brennus with water-tube boilers was made in 1887, and she was the first large ship to be equipped with them. Electricity for lighting, searchlights, pumps, ventilators and other equipment was provided by four 400-ampere dynamos, each driven by a dedicated internal-combustion engine.

Armament and armor 

Brennuss main battery consisted of three 42-caliber Canon de  Modèle 1887 guns, two in a twin turret forward of the superstructure, and the third in a single turret aft. Designed to have a rate of fire of one round per two minutes, the actual rate of fire was about half that in service. The ship initially stowed 39 shells for each gun, but this was later increased to 61. The ship's secondary armament consisted of ten 45-caliber Canon de  Modèle 1893 guns, four of which were mounted in single turrets amidships; the other six were located directly underneath them in casemates. They had a muzzle velocity of  when firing their  CI or  AP or SAP shells.

For defense against torpedo boats, Brennus was equipped with a suite of quick-firing guns, the largest of which were four 50-caliber Canon de  Modèle 1891 guns in single unshielded mounts on the fore and aft superstructure. The suite was rounded out by fourteen 40-caliber  Modèle 1885 guns and fourteen  Modèle 1885 Hotchkiss guns, of which six of the latter were 5-barrel revolver cannon. All of these guns were positioned in the fighting tops on the military masts and in the superstructure. The ship was also fitted with four above-water  torpedo tubes on rotating mounts, two on each broadside. She carried two Modèle 1889 torpedoes for each tube.

Brennuss armor mostly consisted of nickel steel.

Construction and career 

Brennus, named after the Gallic chieftain, was laid down at the Arsenal de Lorient on 2 January 1889 and launched on 17 October 1891. Fitting-out work was completed in 1893, but serious problems with her stability delayed her commissioning. The day after her stability trials on 17 June, the shipyard was notified that there would be a seven-month delay in the delivery of her propellers and the  decided that the ship would use the propellers from the ironclad  in the interim. The following month, the Arsenal de Brest submitted a proposal to lighten the ship which it estimated was  overweight, which was approved on 30 October.

To reduce the ship's excessive topweight, the bridge wings and the overhang of the bridge over the main-gun turrets was eliminated. More importantly, the top deck of the superstructure was removed and the aft military mast was replaced by a pole mast. To further reduce weight, the torpedo nets were removed and the boat stowage was lowered by one deck. To improve her stability, a watertight caisson was added at the waterline over her belt armor. The opportunity was taken to replace her propellers and the 164.7 mm Modèle 1887 guns initially installed were replaced by the latest model.

Despite these modifications, the ship was not fully satisfactory.
The ship has good qualities but also major defects. The most serious problem is that when engaging on the broadside the ship is effectively unarmoured. The 340 mm turrets are too heavy and are not balanced, and when both are trained on the same beam the heel of the ship is such that the upper edge of the belt is level with the water. This means that the only side protection against enemy shell is provided by the 10 cm upper belt. The thickness of the armour belt at its lower edge—only 25 cm—and the large turning circle are further weaknesses.

1896–1900

Brennus finally entered service on 11 January 1896 at a cost of F25,083,675, although her post-trials refit made her unavailable until 1 April. Despite her problems, as the most modern capital ship of the French fleet, she served as the flagship of the Mediterranean Squadron under  (Vice admiral) Alfred Gervais. While towing targets for the other ships in her squadron on 24 August, the ship was accidentally fired upon by the torpedo cruiser ; one man was wounded in the incident. Gervais was relieved by  Jules de Cuverville on 15 October, who was replaced in his turn by  Edgar Humann on 15 October 1897. That year, the  issued a new doctrine for gunnery control. Their success prompted the Navy to make this method the standard for the fleet in February 1898. On 16 April 1898, Félix Faure, President of France, boarded the ship to watch maneuvers.

The ship participated in the annual fleet maneuvers during 8–20 July. Navy Minister Édouard Lockroy then observed gunnery exercises aboard her in September that culminated with the sinking of the old floating battery . Ernest François Fournier hoisted his flag aboard Brennus as commander of the Mediterranean Squadron on 1 October. Augustin Boué de Lapeyrère became captain of the ship that same day. Desiring a figurehead for his ship, he located an old one of the goddess Ceres in storage and ordered that she be refashioned into a Gaul. He also ordered his chief engineer to make a suitable copper helmet for the figurehead. As tensions between France and Great Britain rose during the Fashoda Incident, the squadron's sailors had their leave canceled on 18 October and the battleships loaded their full complement of ammunition before disembarking it on 5 November when the two countries settled their differences.

During the squadron's cruise of the Eastern Mediterranean in October–December 1899, the ship hosted a dinner for Queen Olga of Greece before returning to Toulon on 21 December. During the 1900 maneuvers held from March to July, she served as Fournier's flagship. The exercises began on 6 March, and Brennus went to sea with four of the battleships and four protected cruisers for maneuvers off Golfe-Juan, including night-firing training. Throughout April, the ships visited numerous French ports along the Mediterranean coast, and on 31 May the fleet steamed to Corsica for a visit that lasted until 8 June. After completing its own exercises in the Mediterranean, the Mediterranean Squadron rendezvoused with the Northern Squadron off Lisbon, Portugal, in late June before proceeding to Quiberon Bay for joint maneuvers in July. The maneuvers concluded with a naval review in Cherbourg on 19 July for President Émile Loubet.

On 1 August, the Mediterranean Squadron departed for Toulon, arriving on 14 August. While cruising off Cape St. Vincent during the voyage back on the night of 10/11 August, Brennus accidentally collided with the destroyer , sinking her and killing forty-seven of her crew; only fourteen men were rescued. After reaching Toulon, the fleet then departed a week later for gunnery training off Porquerolles. On 30 September she was replaced as the squadron flagship by the new battleship . The ship began a lengthy refit on 17 October that lasted until 1 June 1901.

1901–1922
In this role, she spent most of the year with a reduced crew, which was augmented by naval reservists during the annual fleet maneuvers. After a short refit in January 1903, Brennus was one of the ships that visited Cartagena, in honor of King Alfonso XIII of Spain. Horace Jauréguiberry relieved Besson on 10 September. He was relieved in his turn by  Paul-Louis Germinet on 10 August 1905. Navy Minister Gaston Thomson observed exercises aboard the battleship which visited Corsica and ports in southern France during 17–28 October.

For the 1906 maneuvers, Fournier came aboard his old flagship during the exercises. The maneuvers lasted from 3 July to 3 August, at which point the fleet returned to Toulon; the next day, the fleet dispersed. The transport  broke her anchor chain in Toulon harbor on 4 December and collided with Brennus. The battleship was not significantly damaged, but Dives ran aground. There was a small fire on 12 June in the forward main-gun turret that badly burned the miscreant who had lit a gasoline-soaked rag. Brennus became a private ship on 16 August and she was reduced to reserve nine days later. The ship was assigned to the torpedo school on 15 November 1909 as a training ship and her main guns were modified to improve their rate of fire over the next two years. Brennus participated in a large naval review by President Armand Fallières off Cap Brun on 4 September. The following day she collided with the excursion ship ; there were no casualties aboard either ship, but Magali had to be beached lest she sink.

The battleship was again placed in reserve on 1 January 1912 and was paid off on 1 April 1914. During the First World War, she was hulked, cannibalized for spare parts and equipment, and was stripped of her main guns in 1915. Brennus was stricken from the naval register on 22 August 1919 and was listed for sale on 30 October. The ship was transferred on 13 January 1921 to the company that had salvaged the wreck of the pre-dreadnought battleship  as payment for their work. She briefly served as a storeship before being broken up for scrap in 1922.

Footnotes

References 

 
 
 
 
 
 
 
 

1891 ships
Battleships of the French Navy
Ships built in France